The Victoria Swing Bridge is a swing bridge in Leith, Edinburgh.

History

The bridge was built between 1871 and 1874 to service the new docks. It was engineered by Rendel and Robertson, with J. H. Bostock as resident engineer. McDonald & Grant were contractors for the foundations, and the bridge was built by the Skerne Iron Works.

Until the completion of the Kincardine Bridge, also in Scotland, in 1936, it is thought to have been the longest clear swing bridge span in Britain (The Swing Bridge, River Tyne, completed two years after the Victoria Bridge, has a longer deck span).

After restoration, it was reopened on 22 November 2000 by Eric Milligan, Lord Provost of Edinburgh.

Design

The bridge carried two tracks of a dock railway and a road, and there are footpaths on either side outside the truss structure. The tracks and roadway have now been removed, and the bridge has a wooden deck.

The bridge was powered hydraulically by a power station just to the north. It swung to the north, and the space afforded for the counterbalance can still be seen.

It has been succeeded by a new bridge further downstream, which carries a roadway known as Ocean Drive.

References

Buildings and structures in Leith
Swing bridges in Scotland
Bridges in Edinburgh
Bridges across the Water of Leith